Aust Cliff is a 5.3 hectare geological Site of Special Scientific Interest adjacent to the Severn Estuary, near the village of Aust, South Gloucestershire, notified in 1954.  The Severn Bridge crosses the cliff.

Its SSSI designation is due to the presence of fossil beds.  The site is famous for its Rhaetic bone bed, and is also the most productive locality in Britain for Triassic insects.

The lower part of the cliff is a red mudstone, with bands of nodules of pinkish-white alabaster.  Above the red mudstone is green mudstone, followed by the Rhaetic bone bed at the base of a band of black shale.  Above the shale are cream-coloured limestone beds.

Paleofauna

References

External links 
 English Nature citation sheet for the SSSI (accessed 9 July 2006)

Sites of Special Scientific Interest in Avon
Sites of Special Scientific Interest notified in 1954
Geology of Gloucestershire
Cliffs of England
River Severn